Ouratea elegans is a species of plant in the family Ochnaceae. It is endemic to Jamaica.

References

elegans
Critically endangered plants
Endemic flora of Jamaica
Taxonomy articles created by Polbot